The Alabama School of Mathematics and Science (ASMS) is a public residential high school in the Midtown neighborhood of Mobile, Alabama.  ASMS is a member of the National Consortium of Secondary STEM Schools (NCSSS). It graduated its first class in 1993.

The school was founded in 1989 as a unique public-private partnership. The Alabama School of Mathematics and Science is part of the state government, while the Alabama School of Mathematics and Science Foundation coordinates private support. It was modeled after the North Carolina School of Science and Mathematics and the Louisiana School for Math, Science, and the Arts where students complete their final two or three years of high school focusing on advanced studies in mathematics and the sciences. Although a boarding school, it does not charge for tuition, books, room, or board. The only fees include an annual student activity fee, which covers class trips and other day-to-day activities, along with an enrollment fee (for new students only), a PSAT fee, and a graduation fee. The annual student activity fee was $1,575 for the 2019 - 2020 school year. The school's focus is preparing its students for higher education, and residency is a requirement for all students.

ASMS's mascot is a dragon.

Academics
All courses are taught at the Advanced Placement or Honors level. ASMS offers Advanced Placement courses in Biology, Chemistry, Computer Science A, Environmental Science, Physics B, Physics C, Studio Art, English Literature and United States History. More than 40% of ASMS instructors hold terminal degrees, all have earned at least a master's degree, and nearly 100% have taught at the college level. According to Newsweek, the school was the third most effective in turning out college-ready graduates in the State of Alabama and 182nd nationally in 2012. The academic program, which is comprehensive in the sciences as well as the humanities, is complemented by varsity and intramural sports, residential life activities, and college counseling.
ASMS is accredited by the Southern Association of Colleges and Schools and is a member of the National Consortium of Secondary STEM Schools, Science and Technology, or NCSSS.

Admission is open to all Alabama high school students via a process akin to college admissions. Initially, students could enter only as high school juniors, but in September 1998 the school also allowed sophomores to apply for entry. Students have been admitted as seniors, but this is extremely rare.

For the class of 2016, the average composite ACT score for the class of 2016 was 29.0 and 100% of the graduates matriculated on to institutions of higher education

Summer program
ASMS also offers an academic summer camp for students entering the 6th through 9th grades. The Adventures In Math and Science summer program is typically held in June and enrolls roughly 1,000 students over the course of three weeks. Students from across Alabama can enroll in classes that are taught by ASMS instructors. Courses include: 3D Printing and Design; ACT Prep; All About Animals – Inside and Out; Apps for Smart Devices; Basic Geometry with Computers; CSI: Fun Forensics; Discovering the Alabama Outdoors; Drones and Race cars; Environmental Science; Estuaries: Where Rivers Meet the Sea; Exploring Inner Space; Game Design with Unity 3D; Geology of Minecraft; Invertebrate Zoology; Labs of Doom; Land, Sea, and Air: Basic Navigation, Buoyancy, and Energy of Propulsion; Learning Linux using the Raspberry Pi; Marine Biology; Meteorology; Phun Physics; Python Programming with Raspberry Pi; Robotics; Rocketry; and Studying Nature-Field Biology. The camp offers a residential program as well as a day-school program. AIMS runs for three week-long sessions. Each AIMS student takes three courses of their choice per week each weekday with a weekend interim period at a local waterpark for students staying more than one week. Admissions to AIMS is highly competitive. More than 50 percent of incoming, full-time students have attended the AIMS summer program. AIMS is made possible from the ASMSEA. ASMSEA stands for ASMS Educational Association and has hosted the many different camps available. The association decides which camps to host the cost and many other details involved. It has around 15 board members, but anyone can vote for a new program.

Facilities

The school was formerly the site of Dauphin Way Baptist Church and underwent extensive alterations to create classrooms, laboratories, and dormitories. In May 2006, the school commenced groundbreaking on the first new building since the building of the Boy's Dorm.  This construction demolished the old Student Activities Center (SAC), and was completed for the start of the 2007–08 academic year. The new building, called the Ann Smith Bedsole Building, as named after one of the main founders of the school, former State Senator Ann Bedsole. The Bedsole Building includes a new library, reception area, several classrooms and offices, a coffee room, TV/lounge room, and games room.

In previous years, the girls' dormitory was spread out over two buildings, floors one through four being in the girls' dorm building, while the "fifth floor" was actually on the fourth floor of the humanities building. At the end of the 2009–10 school year, faculty decided to close "fifth floor," and it was used as storage for extra furniture. Following the 2016–17 school year the floor was renovated to become the Honor hall. The boys' dormitory is contained in one two-story building. Both the boys' and girls' dorms are divided into four halls- Einstein, Curie, Newton, and Da Vinci- which compete in several contests, such as a talent show and goofy olympics, throughout the school year to determine the year's winning hall. Girls on the "fifth floor" in Honor hall are divided amongst the other halls to ensure everyone takes part in activities.

School traditions

Geekfest
Mike Zambrano, in the fall of 2004, 2005, president of High Fantasy, a role playing and card game club, in a collaborative effort with the Presidents of: the DDR club, Matt McCawley '05; the Anime club, Licki Kallenberg '05; and Anindo Sarker '05 organized a large, entertainment oriented event that involved the whole student body. Due to its popularity, the event became a school tradition, generally held once each trimester. The principal organizers for the 05-06 year were Jonathan Kush '06 and Jean-Jacques DeLisle '06, presidents of the anime and RPG clubs respectively. The current organization of geekfest is no longer handled by the former three clubs, but operates as an independent organization.

This event operates similar to a small fan convention, and includes activities that are predominantly associated with "Geek" culture. Such activities include anime and/or film showings, a LAN party for PCs, independent console games, board games, card games, DDR, Guitar Hero, as well as other events. The event is traditionally held in the SAC, but renovations have caused the event to be moved to several different locations. During the 2006-07 year Geekfest was held in multiple areas inside the Administration building.  Upon the completion of the Bedsole Building, geekfest was held in areas around the first floor.

Stress Fest
On the last weekend before finals of the Spring term, the school hosts Stress Fest, designed to alleviate students' stress and give them time to enjoy themselves before tests. The event mainly consists of: field games, tournaments, a rock wall, ice cream truck, tie-dye T-shirts, barbecue, and live bands.

Student publications
 Oculus: features poetry, short stories, and works of art created by the students
 Firewire: the school newspaper
 Azimuth: the school yearbook

Notable alumni
 Jeffrey Cotten (Class of 1999) - Founding member of Makers Local 256
 Virgil Griffith (Class of 2002) - Creator of WikiScanner, convicted for assisting North Korea in evading international sanctions.
 Ryan Williams - Professor of Computer Science at Stanford University

See also
 Arkansas School for Mathematics, Sciences, and the Arts
 Carol Martin Gatton Academy of Mathematics and Science in Kentucky
 Craft Academy for Excellence in Science and Mathematics
 Illinois Mathematics and Science Academy
 Indiana Academy for Science, Mathematics, and Humanities
 Kansas Academy of Mathematics and Science
 Louisiana School for Math, Science, and the Arts
 Maine School of Science and Mathematics 
 Mississippi School for Mathematics and Science
 North Carolina School of Science and Mathematics
 Oklahoma School of Science and Mathematics
 South Carolina Governor's School for Science and Mathematics
 Texas Academy of Mathematics and Science

References

External links
 ASMS homepage
 ASMS Alumni Association

Gifted education
Public high schools in Alabama
NCSSS schools
Boarding schools in Alabama
Educational institutions established in 1989
Schools in Mobile, Alabama
Public boarding schools in the United States
1989 establishments in Alabama